Brickleberry is an American animated comedy sitcom that premiered on September 25, 2012, and ended on April 14, 2015 on Comedy Central. The series, created by Roger Black and Waco O'Guin, follows a group of forest rangers that work in fictional Brickleberry National Park, the national park in America.

A total of 36 episodes were produced before it was announced that the series would not return for a fourth season. In spite of this, a crossover episode with Paradise PD was made.

Series overview

Episodes

Season 1 (2012)

Season 2 (2013)
Starting this season, comedian Natasha Leggero has taken over the role of Ethel from Kaitlin Olson and the animation switches from Adobe Flash animation to traditional animation with digital ink and paint as proof of concept. Also, the intro is slightly altered to follow the episode's plot, most of the time following the cold open.

Season 3 (2014–15)

Crossover Special

Ratings

References

External links
 
 

Brickleberry
Brickleberry